Generation of Vipers is a 1943 book by Philip Wylie. In it Wylie criticizes various aspects and beliefs of contemporary American society, including Christianity; prominent figures such as politicians, teachers, and doctors; and "momism" or the adoration of mothers.

History
Wylie wrote the book in Miami Beach, Florida beginning on May 12, 1942 and ending on July 4, 1942; he felt disillusioned after having a job with the U.S. government providing information about World War II. The book was published in January 1943.

By 1955 the book had twenty printings; by then a new edition of the book came out.

Reception
Mike Wallace stated in his 1957 interview of Wylie that many viewers had criticized Wylie's conclusions about mothers, and Wylie responded by stating that he was only talking about a certain type of mother.

In 2005, Jonathan Yardley of the Washington Post argued that the book had not aged well in his second reading; he had first read the book in the 1960s.

References

Further reading
 Bowman, James. "Not the greatest generation." (Reconsiderations)("Generation of Vipers" by Philip Wylie )(Critical essay)  New Criterion, March, 2013, Vol.31(7), p. 27(4)
 Rogers, Michael. "Wylie, Philip. Generation of Vipers." (Brief article)(Book review) Library Journal, Sept 15, 2007, Vol.132(15), p. 100(1)
 Rogers, Michael. "Generation of Vipers". Library Journal. December 1996, Vol.121(20), p. 154.
 Plant, Rebecca, with Ross, Dorothy (advisor). "The repeal of mother love: Momism and the reconstruction of motherhood in Philip Wylie's America." PhD thesis, 2002.
 "Generation of Vipers" (Book Review). Science Fiction Studies, July, 1995, Vol.22, p. 234.
 Seed, David. "The Postwar Jeremiads of Philip Wylie." Science Fiction Studies, 1 July 1995, Vol.22(2), pp. 234–251

External links
 Excerpt from the book: "Chapter XI: Common Women."

1943 non-fiction books
Farrar & Rinehart books